Cawston is a village and civil parish in the Broadland district of Norfolk, England. Nearby towns are Reepham and Aylsham.

History
Cawston's name is of Anglo-Saxon origin and derives from the Old English for Kalfr's farmstead or settlement.

In the Domesday Book, Cawston was recorded as being a settlement of 26 households in the hundred of South Erpingham. In 1086, the village was divided between the estates of King William and William de Warenne.

Cawston was the scene of Norfolk's last duel, which occurred illegally in August of 1698 between Sir Henry Hobart of Blickling Hall and Oliver Le Neve of Great Witchingham. The duel was fought with swords and resulted in the fatal wounding of Hobart resulting in Le Neve fleeing to the Netherlands. Today, a memorial stone to the duel is maintained by the National Trust.

Geography
In the 2011 Census, Cawston was recorded as having a population of 1,640 residents living in 704 households.

Cawston falls within the constituency of Mid Norfolk and is represented at Parliament by George Freeman MP of the Conservative Party.

St. Agnes' Church
Cawston's Parish Church is of Norman origin and is dedicated to Saint Agnes. St. Agnes' was heavily restored in the Fourteenth Century at the request of Michael de la Pole, the new lord of the manor. The church holds many good examples of Medieval stained-glass windows and several panel paintings depicting the lives of saints.

Transport
Cawston railway station opened in 1880 as part of the Great Eastern Railway and closed in 1952 due to declining passenger numbers. The station building is now a private residence.

Amenities
Local children attend Cawston Church of England Primary School which moved into its current building in 1953. The school was awarded a 'Good' rating by Ofsted in 2016.

Notable Residents
 Matthew Fletcher- British fundraiser and student

War Memorial

And, the following for the Second World War:
 Flying-Officer Leonard A. Barham (1915-1944), No. 199 Squadron RAF
 Able-Seaman S. Frederick Gaskin (1923-1942), HMS Cornwall
 Lance-Corporal Eric G. Monsey (1925-1945), 1st Battalion, East Surrey Regiment

References

External links

Broadland
Villages in Norfolk
Civil parishes in Norfolk